Peter England Mr India 2017 was the ninth edition of Mr India World contest  held on 14 December in Mumbai. Sixteen contestants from all over the country were shortlisted to compete in the finals. Previous year's winner, Mr India 2016, Vishnu Raj Menon passed on his title to Jitesh Singh Deo of Lucknow. Bollywood actress Kangana Ranaut took part of the event to felicitate the winners.

Jitesh will represent India at the Mister World 2022 contest in 2022 and Prathamesh Maulingkar of Goa titled Mr India Supranational 2017 and represented the nation at Mister Supranational 2018 on 8 December where he won the title. He became the first Asian to win the Mister Supranational title.

Results
Color key

Special Awards

Contestants
16 contestants from all over India were shortlisted to compete in the main event in Mumbai.

Crossover
Contestants who previously competed or will be competing at other international beauty pageants:

Mister International
 2019: Balaji Murugadoss

References

External links
 Mr India Official Website

India
Beauty pageants in India
Mister World